The 2016–17 Basketbol Süper Ligi (BSL) was the 51st season of the top-tier professional basketball league in Turkey. The season started on October 8, 2016. Fenerbahçe won their eighth national championship this season.

Teams

Promotion and relegation
Türk Telekom and Torku Konyaspor were relegated after finishing in the 15th and 16th places last season. Best Balıkesir was promoted as the runner-up, and Tofaş was promoted as the champions of the 2015–16 TBL season.

Locations and stadia

Notes
 Team makes its debut in the BSL.
 The defending champions, winners of the 2015–16 BSL season.

Regular season

League table

Results

Playoffs

Awards and statistics

Statistical leaders

Turkish clubs in European competitions

References

External links
Official Site
TBLStat.net History Page

Turkish Basketball Super League seasons
Turkish
1